End of the Line is a 2007 Canadian horror film written, produced and directed by Maurice Devereaux.

Plot
Karen, a traumatized woman, has a horrific nightmare involving a subway train. The flashback narrative plot follows her trapped in a subway. A Christian doomsday cult, which has been consuming and distributing hallucinogen-laced muffins that make people see visions of flashlight-eyed demons. On a texted signal, they take over services and begins massacring non-believers throughout the city, believing it is their mission to "save" the souls of humanity for God, which can only be accomplished by killing people with swords and daggers. It is not possible to get help by calling 911, because all the phones are controlled by cultists, who also control the TV, the internet and the radio. A group of surviving train passengers and subway workers try to fight off and escape the cultists, but die one by one, leaving only Karen, Mike, and Viviane alive when the cultists are signaled to commit a mass suicide.

Cast

Soundtrack
The soundtrack composed by Martin Gauthier was released on July 20, 2010, by 2m1 Records.

Reception
The film debuted in limited release, but it garnered mostly favorable reviews from the few critics who saw it.  The Village Voice called it "scary as hell and impressively unrelenting."  C. Robert Cargill from Ain't It Cool praised it as a "truly inspired original effort," noting its modest budget and its daring, unusual premise.  The film also won prizes at several festivals including Fantastic Fest's Special Jury Prize.

References

External links

2007 films
Religious horror films
2007 horror films
2000s English-language films
Canadian independent films
2000s thriller films
Canadian thriller films
Canadian supernatural horror films
Dystopian films
English-language Canadian films
Apocalyptic films
Demons in film
2000s Canadian films